Hošťka is a municipality and village in Tachov District in the Plzeň Region of the Czech Republic. It has about 500 inhabitants.

Administrative parts
The village of Žebráky is an administrative part of Hošťka.

References

Villages in Tachov District